Ivan Viktorovich Chudin (born 7 March 1990) is a Russian professional football player. He plays for FC Akron Tolyatti.

Club career
He made his Russian Football National League debut for FC Ural Yekaterinburg on 9 August 2009 in a game against FC Luch-Energiya Vladivostok.

Career statistics
Statistics accurate as of matches played on 22 August 2014

External links
 
 

1990 births
Sportspeople from Yekaterinburg
Living people
Russian footballers
Association football midfielders
FC Ural Yekaterinburg players
FC Gornyak Uchaly players
FC Novokuznetsk players
FC Volga Ulyanovsk players
FC Tyumen players
FC Nizhny Novgorod (2015) players
FC Akron Tolyatti players
Russian First League players
Russian Second League players